Anlo is one of the constituencies represented in the Parliament of Ghana. It elects one Member of Parliament (MP) by the first past the post system of election. Anlo is located in the Keta district  of the Volta Region of Ghana.

Boundaries
The seat is located within the Keta District of the Volta Region of Ghana.

Members of Parliament

Elections

See also
List of Ghana Parliament constituencies

External links and sources 

Electoral Commission of Ghana
Adam Carr's Election Archives
Ghana Web

Parliamentary constituencies in the Volta Region